Zalošče is a village in western Slovenia in the Municipality of Nova Gorica. It is located in the lower Vipava Valley in the Gorizia region of the Slovene Littoral.

History

In the northern part of the village, there is a large building that used to be a monastery in the 16th and 17th centuries. There is an Austro-Hungarian military cemetery from the First World War on a small hill next to Saint Lawrence's Church. The individual grave markers are no longer present, and only the central monument remains.

Church

The local church is dedicated to Saint Lawrence and belongs to the Parish of Dornberk.

Notable people
Notable people that were born or lived in Zalošče include:
Rafael Rojic (1844–1927), physician and politician
Ivan Rejec (1878–1958), sociologist and translator

References

External links

Zalošče on Geopedia

Populated places in the City Municipality of Nova Gorica